Roy Lucas was a former American football coach.  He served as the head football at the West Virginia University Institute of Technology in Montgomery, West Virginia from 1976 until 1982, compiling a record of 26–35–4. He is the younger brother of former National Basketball Association player Jerry Lucas. Lucas died on August 26, 2019 in Edgewood, Kentucky.

References

1941 births
2019 deaths
Morehead State Eagles football coaches
West Virginia Tech Golden Bears football coaches
High school football coaches in Ohio
Sportspeople from Middletown, Ohio